Walton  is a toponymic surname or placename of Anglo-Saxon origins. It derives from a place with the suffix tun ('town, farm, hamlet') and one of the prefixes wald ('a wood'), walesc ('foreigner') or walh ('farm worker'). First recorded as a surname in Oxfordshire in the person of Odo de Wolton on the Hundred Rolls in 1273. People with the name include:

A
 Adam Walton (b. 1971), British radio DJ
 Alan Walton (1936–2015), British-born businessman
 Albert D. Walton (1886–1951), American Attorney
 Alfred Walton (1816–1883), British radical politician
 Alice Walton (b. 1949), American heiress, daughter of Wal-Mart founder Sam Walton
 Alice Walton (1865-1954), American classicist and archaeologist
 Alvin Walton {b. 1964), American football player
 Amy Catherine Walton (1849–1939), British author
 Amy and Emily Walton (b. 2000), twins appearing on the British soap Coronation Street
 Ann Walton Kroenke, American Wal-Mart heiress, wife of Stan Kroenke
 Anthony Walton (politician) (born 1962), former New Zealand political party president
 Anthony Walton (poet) (born 1960), American poet and writer
 Asmaa Walton, American artist and art educator

B
 Bernard Walton (1917–1972), a British classical clarinetist
 Bill Walton (b. 1952), American basketball player
 Billy Walton (1871–1963), English footballer
 Brandon Walton (born 1998), American football player
 Brian Walton (bishop) (1600–1661), English cleric and scholar
 Brian Walton (cyclist) (b. 1965), Canadian track cyclist
 Bruce Walton (1951-2019), American football player
 Bruce Walton (b. 1962), American baseball player
 Bruce Alan Walton (b. 1960), alias "Branton," American author
 Bryce Walton (1918–1988), American pulp fiction writer

C
 Cecile Walton (1891–1956), Scottish artist
 Cedar Walton (1934–2013), American pianist
 Chadwick Walton, Jamaican cricketer
 Chelsea Walton (b. 1983), African-American mathematician
 Chris Walton (1933–2006), English cricketer
 Christian Walton (b. 1995), English footballer
 Christy Walton, American Wal-Mart heiress
 Clare Walton, British senior Royal Air Force officer
 Clarence C. Walton, American academic administrator, The Catholic University of America
 Constance Walton (1919-2017), American composer
 Craig Walton (b. 1975), Australian Olympic athlete

D
 Danny Walton (b. 1947), American baseball player
 David Walton (disambiguation)
 Dean Walton, a fictional character in Degrassi: The Next Generation
 Donovan Walton (b. 1994), American baseball player
 Dorothy Walton (1909–1981), Canadian badminton player
 Douglas Walton (disambiguation)
 Dwight Walton (b. 1965), Canadian basketball player

E
 Edward Arthur Walton (1860–1922), Scottish artist
 Elijah Walton (1832–1880), English artist
 Ernest Walton (1903–1995), Irish physicist and Nobel Prize winner
 Evangeline Walton (1907–1996), American author
 Emma Walton (1962–present), British children's book author

F
 Fred Walton (1865–1936), English stage actor
 Frederick Walton (1834–1928) Industrialist and inventor of Linoleum
 Frederick Walton (engineer) (1840–1925) British railway engineer

G
 Genevieve M. Walton (1857–1932), American librarian
 Geoffrey Walton (1934–2020), British archdeacon
 George Walton (Royal Navy), British admiral
 George Walton (1749/50–1804), American politician
 George Walton (Manitoba politician) (died 1925), Canadian politician
 George Walton (footballer) (born 1911), English footballer
 Gordon Walton (b. 1956), American computer game developer
 Col. Granville Walton, The Scout Association Scouting notable, awardee of the Bronze Wolf in 1955

H
 Harold Walton (cricketer) (1874–1960), New Zealand cricketer
 Helen Walton (1919–2007), American heiress, widow of Wal-Mart founder Sam Walton
 Henry Walton (disambiguation)

I
 India Walton (b. 1982), mayor-elect of Buffalo, New York
 Izaak Walton (1593–1683), English writer

J
 James "Bud" Walton (1921–1995), American retailer, co-founder of Wal-Mart
 Javon Walton, American child actor
 Jerome Walton (b. 1965), American baseball player  
 Jess Walton (b. 1949), American actress
 Jim Walton (b. 1948), American banker and Wal-Mart heir
 Jim Walton (journalist) (b. 1958), American journalist, president of CNN Worldwide
 Jo Walton (b. 1964), British-born fantasy and science fiction writer
 Joe Walton (b. 1935), American football coach 
 Joseph Walton (footballer), English footballer
 John Walton (disambiguation):
 John Walton (1738-1783), American politician, Georgia delegate to the Continental Congress
 John C. Walton (1881–1949), American politician, Governor of Oklahoma
 John H. Walton (b. 1952), American Old Testament scholar
 John T. Walton (1946–2005), American businessman and Wal-Mart heir
 John Walton (actor), Australian actor
 John Ike Walton, American musician and member of 1960s rock group 13th Floor Elevators
 Johnathan Walton (b. 1974), Jamaican-born television reporter
 Joseph Walton (convict) (b. 1830), Canadian-born convict transported to Western Australia

K
 Kendall Walton, American philosopher and academic
 Kent Walton (1917–2003), British television sports commentator
 Kevin Walton (1918-2009), Antarctic explorer
 Krista S. Walton, American chemical engineer

L
 Lee Walton American artist
 Lisa Walton (b. 1975), New Zealand field hockey player
 Luke Walton (b. 1980), American basketball player

M
 Mark Walton (American football) (b. 1997), American football player
 Mary Walton (1827–1894), American inventor
 Mike Walton (b. 1945), Canadian hockey player
 Marcus Walton (b. 1989), English Film Producer

N
 Nancy Walton Laurie, American Wal-Mart heiress
 Nancy Bird-Walton (1915-2009), Australian aviator

O
 Mrs O. F. Walton (Amy Catherine Walton, 1849–1939), British author

P
 Percy Levar Walton, American convicted murderer
 Peter Walton (rugby player), Scottish rugby player and coach
 Peter Walton (referee), English football referee
 Philip Walton (b. 1962), Irish golfer

R
 Rachel Mellon Walton (b. 1899), American philanthropist
 Reggie Walton (b. 1949), American District Judge
 Rhett Walton, Australian actor
 Richard J. Walton, American politician and academic
 Rob Walton (ice hockey) (b. 1949), Canadian ice hockey player
 S. Robson Walton (b. 1945), American lawyer and Wal-Mart heir
 Roy Walton (1932–2020), British card magician

S
 Sam Walton (1918–1992), American retailer, founder of Wal-Mart
 Sam Walton (American football) (1943-2002), American football player
 Sarah Stokes Walton (1844–1899), American poet and artist
 Simon Walton (born 1987), English football player
 Sophie Walton (born 1989), English women's footballer
 Wayne Walton (1943-2020), American Master Carpenter
 Susana Walton (1926–2010), widow of William Walton

T
 Tasma Walton (b. 1974), Australian actress.
 Thomas Otto Walton, president of Texas A&M University 1925-1943
 Timothy Walton (disambiguation)
 Tony Walton (b. 1934), English set and costume designer and director
 Travis Walton (b. 1953), American alien abductee

W
 William Walton (disambiguation), several people
 William Walton (merchant) (1706–1768), American merchant and politician in New York
 William Walton (1902–1983), British composer
 William Walton (1909/1910-1994) American painter and former chairman, U.S. Commission on Fine Arts

Other
 Walton family, connected to Wal-Mart
 The Waltons, American television series
 The Walton sextuplets, the world's first all-female surviving sextuplets, born in 1983

See also
 Wolton (surname)
 Walton (given name)

References

English-language surnames